"Love Is a Battlefield" is a song by American singer Pat Benatar, recorded and released on September 12, 1983, as a single from Benatar's live album Live from Earth (1983), though the song itself was a studio recording. It was written by Holly Knight and Mike Chapman. The song was ranked at number 30 in VH1's list of the 100 Greatest Songs of the 1980s. "Love Is a Battlefield" went on to sell over a million records.

Background and composition
Knight and Chapman wrote this song for Benatar initially as a mid tempo song. After some exploration with drum machines and the band, producer Neil Giraldo decided to make it an uptempo song. The single was Benatar's second US million-seller and is tied with "We Belong" as her highest-charting single in the United States. It topped Billboard's Mainstream Rock Tracks chart for four weeks and peaked at number five on the Billboard Hot 100 in December 1983.

It reached number one on the Australian singles chart in February 1984 and remained there for five weeks, becoming the 11th biggest-selling single of the year. In the Netherlands, the song topped the charts for four weeks; it reached number two on the 1984 year-end chart. The song was re-released in the United Kingdom in March 1985 and reached number 17. It was awarded a gold certification in Canada as well.

The single was unlike most of Benatar's previous work, as it featured an electronic dance element, but guitars and drums were still present. In 1984, the song won Benatar her fourth consecutive Grammy Award for Best Female Rock Vocal Performance.

"Love Is a Battlefield" is set in the key of D minor, at a tempo of 91 beats per minute.

Music video
The Bob Giraldi-directed music video features Benatar playing a rebellious teenage girl getting kicked out of her home.  Her father (played by actor Trey Wilson) berates her as her mother watches helplessly. Benatar waves goodbye to her brother (played by actor Philip Cruise), who watches sadly from an upstairs window. She later becomes a taxi dancer at a seedy club in the city. She writes letters to her brother, who is reassured that she is okay, as her father begins to regret kicking her out. When she witnesses the club owner (played by actor Gary Chryst) harassing another dancer, Benatar rounds up her fellow dancers and leads a rebellion against him.  The dancers get the upper hand on the club owner and escape from the club, dancing off as the sun rises.  After thanking Benatar for helping liberate them, the dancers bid each other goodbye and all go their separate ways. The final scene shows Benatar sitting in the back of a bus headed for parts unknown. The video was choreographed by Michael Peters, who appears briefly in the video.

A special dance club remix of the song was created by Jellybean Benitez. Benitez also created an edited version of his mix specifically for the video.  It differs slightly in structure and instrumentation, and aside from appearing in the video, has never been commercially released.

The video was one of the first ever to feature the use of dialogue - Philip Bailey's "I Know" was the first but Benatar's got more exposure. The scenes featuring dialogue include the opening scene when Benatar’s father shouts, "If you leave this house now, you can just forget about coming back!" and the scene when the club owner harasses the taxi dancer, causing her to scream "Leave me alone!" at him.

The video was nominated for an MTV Video Music Award for Best Female Video and is included on the DVD for the film 13 Going on 30.

Charts

Weekly charts

Year-end charts

Certifications

In popular culture
The song was featured in the television series Psych. In the television series Drop Dead Diva, the song was performed by the actresses Brooke Elliott and Faith Prince. It was also featured in the 2004 film 13 Going on 30, where "love is a battlefield" is the mantra of the main character Jenna Rink, played by Jennifer Garner. The Kay Gee Remix version featuring Kay Gee and Queen Latifah, is played on the end credits of the 1998 film Small Soldiers. The song is also featured in the last episode of season 2 of Stranger Things, prior to the Snow Bal scene. A Russian-language cover version of this song was used in the Family Guy season 19 episode, "Meg Goes to College", in a scene where Meg auditions her talent scholarship. An episode titled "Love is a Battlefield" of  The Flash Season 6 Episode 11 featured this song when Amunet Black and Goldface reconciled.

Cover versions
Co-songwriter of the song, Holly Knight recorded her own version for her 1989 sole debut solo album, Holly Knight.
In 2007, Jann Arden released a cover of the song for her album Uncover Me.
In 2008, the Amity Affliction released a cover of the song for their album Severed Ties. 
In 2013, a cover recorded by Sara Skinner was released which was featured in the eighth episode of the first season of Dynasty, a reboot of the 1980s soap opera of the same name.
In 2014, Chris Colfer as Kurt Hummel and Darren Criss as Blaine Anderson covered the song in the episode "Tested" during the fifth season of Glee.
In 2014, Wrongchilde featuring White Sea released a version of the song. Wrongchilde is the solo project of Mat Devine from Kill Hannah.
In 2019, Luke Evans covered the song as part of his debut album At Last and also released it as his debut single.

See also
List of number-one singles in Australia during the 1980s
BRT Top 30 number-one hits of 1984
List of Dutch Top 40 number-one singles of 1984
List of Billboard Mainstream Rock number-one songs of the 1980s

References

1983 songs
1983 singles
1985 singles
Pat Benatar songs
American new wave songs
Chrysalis Records singles
Dutch Top 40 number-one singles
Grammy Award for Best Female Rock Vocal Performance
Music videos directed by Bob Giraldi
Number-one singles in Australia
Songs written by Holly Knight
Songs written by Mike Chapman
Ultratop 50 Singles (Flanders) number-one singles